The Honored Journalist (also translated as The Merited Journalist of Ukraine) is an honorary title bestowed by Ukraine (before 1991 by the Ukrainian Soviet Socialist Republic or SSR) for "vital contribution" in the country's journalism. The title is awarded by the President of Ukraine and accompanied by a  silver badge.

History 
The honorary title was established by the Supreme Soviet of the Ukrainian SSR on May 7, 1981. By that time, four republics of the former USSR (the Estonian SSR, the Lithuanian SSR, the Georgian SSR, and the Armenian SSR) had already established such an award, whereas the Russian SSR hadn't done so until the dissolution of the Soviet Union. From its inception in 1981, the title required a recipient to have worked in the field of journalism for at least ten years. Originally, a recipient also had to be a member of the "Union of Journalists" of the Ukrainian SSR.

After the dissolution of the USSR in 1991, Merited Journalist of Ukraine was one of 29 honorary titles that newly independent Ukraine inherited from the Ukrainian SSR. Since July 1994, the recipients of the title also receive a silver badge. The first design of the badge, awarded from July 1994 to June 2001, was a  image of a woman's head, wearing a wreath composed of ears of wheat.

Prerequisites and procedure 
As of 2020, the honorary title is awarded in accordance with the Law of Ukraine Regarding the State Awards of Ukraine and the Decree of the President of Ukraine Regarding Honorary Titles of Ukraine. Recipients of the title must have at least ten years' experience in journalism and have a college degree. The decoration is awarded by the President of Ukraine for a candidate's "vital contribution" to Ukraine journalism. The award is accompanied by a  silver badge.

In the case of Ukrainian candidates, recipients are chosen by the Office of the President of Ukraine from lists of journalists submitted by editorial staff of non-profit and commercial media organizations. Then the lists are sanctioned by municipal and regional governments and/or various bodies of the executive or judicial branches. For non-Ukrainian citizens seeking the award, submissions come from the Ukrainian Ministry of Foreign Affairs.

Notable recipients 
 Oleksandr Abdullin
 Hanna Bezliudna
 Boris Lozhkin
 Igor Piddubny
 Savik Shuster

See also 
 Merited Artist of Ukraine
 Honorary titles of Ukraine
 Media of Ukraine

References

Literature cited

External links 
 The document About the State Awards of Ukraine 

Mass media in Ukraine
Honorary titles of Ukraine